The Ven. George Cummins, MA  was the inaugural Archdeacon of Trinidad, serving from 1842 until his death on 23 November 1872.

See also

Notes

1872 deaths
Alumni of St John's College, Cambridge
Archdeacons of Trinidad, North and South
Year of birth missing
Place of birth missing